Benjamin Steinberg (March 15, 1915 – January 29, 1974) was an American concert violinist, conductor, and civil rights activist, who is best remembered as the founding artistic director of the Symphony of the New World, the first racially integrated orchestra in the United States, its premiere concert was at New York City's Carnegie Hall on May 6, 1965.

Early years

Benjamin Steinberg was born in Baltimore, Maryland, on March 15, 1915, to Moses and Annie Steinberg. His parents were from Odessa (then part of Czarist Russia, now Ukraine) and had fled to the United States following the anti-Jewish Odessa pogrom of 1905 and the failed Russian Revolution that year. Benjamin first performed violin on the concert stage as an 11-year old in 1927.

Career in music

Violinist
Steinberg was a violinist in the first violin section of the NBC Symphony Orchestra, playing on their nationwide radio broadcasts in 1943 under the baton of conductor Arturo Toscanini. He was later first violinist with the Pittsburgh Symphony conducted by Fritz Reiner, with whom he also studied conducting. Other conductors under whom Steinberg performed were Otto Klemperer and Leopold Stokowski.

Conductor and music director

Steinberg began conducting in 1941 with the National Youth Administration (NYA) Symphony, having studied under Pierre Monteux. He conducted a performance of Darker America, written in 1924 by African American composer William Grant Still. The performance was broadcast on WNYC (AM) radio in New York city on April 16, 1941. In the composer's program notes, Still wrote that the piece "is representative of the American Negro. His serious side is presented and is intended to suggest the triumph of a people over their sorrows through fervent prayer... the prayer of numbed, rather than anguished souls."

As early as 1940, Benjamin Steinberg began to work with black conductors Dean Dixon and Everett Lee to establish the first fully integrated professional symphony orchestra in the U.S. It would take another two decades to be achieved, however.

Symphony of the New World

As the civil rights movement of the 1960s gained momentum in the US, Steinberg founded a committee to create a symphony orchestra of accomplished musicians and conductors, irrespective of race. The mission statement of the Symphony of the New World was written two months before the Civil Rights Act of 1964 was signed into law. Steinberg accepted the post of music director and obtained funding for the orchestra's first season. The debut concert of the first fully integrated orchestra in America was held at Carnegie Hall on May 6, 1965, two months before the Voting Rights Act of 1965 became law. Steinberg said of the effort, "We have a lot of talent in this city, and we have to create the opportunities to present it to the public".

Sponsors included Samuel Barber, Leonard Bernstein, Ruby Dee, Langston Hughes, William Warfield, Aaron Copland, Duke Ellington, and Zero Mostel. As the orchestra developed, Marian Anderson and Leontyne Price joined the Board of Directors, and James DePriest became Principal Guest Conductor. Another prominent guest conductor was Everett Lee.

The symphony's musicians were graduates of such music schools as Juilliard (Elayne Jones), Eastman School of Music, the Manhattan School of Music, and the New England Conservatory. Its performances were broadcast on the Voice of America and Armed Forces Radio to audiences worldwide. Ebony magazine pronounced it, "for both artistic and sociological reasons, a major development in the musical history of the United States". Following an August 1969, performance by the interracial Symphony, the Asbury Park Press (NJ) was effusive in its praise of Steinberg as the orchestra's "guiding light" in the belief that "discrimination has no place in the world of the symphony orchestra". His conducting was lauded by critic Charles Hill for its "impressive virtuosity".

While music director of the Symphony of the New World, Steinberg collaborated with Pulitzer Prize-winning composer George Walker in the premiere of Walker's Address for Orchestra, performed by the Symphony of the New World in 1968. In 1970, Steinberg conducted the Symphony of the New World at the Lincoln Center, New York City, in a performance of I Have a Dream, a tribute to Martin Luther King Jr. Pulitzer Prize-winning music critic Donal Henahan said of the one-third black Symphony of the New World in 1970, "it regularly demonstrates the validity of its position in the largely lily‐white symphonic world".

Steinberg continued as music director of the Symphony of the New World until October 1971, when he resigned after an acrimonious policy dispute with the orchestra's board. At the time of his resignation, the group had 80 musicians. The papers of the Symphony of the New World reside at the Schomburg Center for Research in Black Culture.

At the ballet

Between 1945–1947, Steinberg was the Assistant Conductor of the American Ballet Theatre. On November 26, 1947, he conducted the premiere of Theme and Variations, choreographed by George Balanchine for prima ballerina assoluta Alicia Alonso and Igor Youskevitch. Steinberg also did a South American tour with Ballet Russe de Monte Carlo with Alonso and Youskevitch in the late 1940s, as well as with Melissa Hayden and Barbara Fallis, both of whom joined Alonso's ballet company in Cuba in 1959.

In 1959, Steinberg became the first music director and conductor of the Cuban National Ballet, the ballet company managed by Alonso, renamed when Fidel Castro came to power that year. Steinberg remained in that post until 1963, when he returned to the United States following a tour of the Soviet Union as conductor of the Cuban National Ballet Symphony Orchestra.

On Broadway

Steinberg conducted many Broadway musicals, including Leonard Bernstein’s production of Peter Pan (1950), starring Jean Arthur and Boris Karloff. Others include The Golden Apple (1954), The Music Man (1957–1958), and A Funny Thing Happened on the Way to the Forum.

Appearance before House Un-American Activities Committee
On June 19, 1958, Steinberg testified before the House Un-American Activities Committee, having been subpoenaed by the Committee as part of its wide-ranging probe of suspected Communist infiltration into the ranks of professional musicians. He declined to answer questions about certain musicians being investigated for Communist affiliation. Although he did not invoke the Fifth Amendment against self-incrimination in his own behalf, Steinberg said that to provide such information about others was an infringement of his right to freedom of association and freedom of speech:

In response to further questioning by Richard Arens, permanent secretary to the Committee from 1957–1960, Steinberg said, "It is now 11 years since the first investigation of cultural artists, and this is the fourth consecutive year in New York City. I consider this an illegal harassment of members of the entertainment industry".

He continued:

Personal life and death

Steinberg met his future wife, Pearl (born Sondak, 1918–1994), while they were both studying music at Curtis Institute. In later years, they made their home in Manhattan. Steinberg died on January 29, 1974, of pancreatic cancer and is survived by a daughter, Barbara.

References

1915 births
1974 deaths
20th-century American conductors (music)
American male conductors (music)
Ballet conductors
Jewish American classical musicians
American classical violinists
Male classical violinists
20th-century classical violinists
Musicians from Baltimore
Curtis Institute of Music alumni
20th-century American male musicians
20th-century American Jews
20th-century American violinists